Thailand competed at the 2018 Winter Olympics in Pyeongchang, South Korea, from 9 to 25 February 2018. Since the nation's official debut in 2002, Thai athletes had appeared in every edition of the Winter Olympic Games, with the exception of the 2010 Winter Olympics in Vancouver.

The National Olympic Committee of Thailand fielded a team of 4 athletes, 2 men and 2 women, to compete in two sports at the Games. It was the nation's largest ever delegation sent to the Winter Olympics.

Competitors

Alpine skiing

Thailand qualified one male and one female alpine skier.

Cross-country skiing

Thailand qualified two athletes, one male and one female. Mark and Karen Chanloung are siblings are half Italian and half Thai and grew up in Gressoney-La-Trinité, Italy.

Distance

Sprint

See also
Thailand at the 2017 Asian Winter Games
Thailand at the 2018 Summer Youth Olympics

References

Nations at the 2018 Winter Olympics
2018
Winter Olympics